The following are authors and illustrators who have created sexually explicit or pornographic manga, anime, or novels, collectively referred to as hentai.

Individuals

See also
List of hentai anime

References

Hentai
 
Hentai authors